Mazyr or Mozyr is a city in Gomel Region, Belarus, situated on the Pripyat River about  east of Pinsk and  northwest of Chernobyl in Ukraine. The population is 111,770 (2004 estimate). The total urban area, including the town of Kalinkavichy across the river, has a population of 150,000. Mazyr is known as a center of oil refining, salt extraction, machine building, and food processing in Belarus. It is home to one of the largest oil refineries in Belarus, pumping out 18 million metric tons per year, and is served by a tram line. The Druzhba pipeline carries crude oil from Russia, splitting in two at Mazyr. One pipeline branch is directed into Poland and the other one to Ukraine.

Jewish community 
Jews were first mentioned in chronicles in the second half of the 17th century. It is known that there were three synagogues in the city as of 1856. R. Kugel, a prominent Jewish community figure, had been the chief Rabbi of Mazyr since 1861. He was also the head of the local Jewish literacy school.

During this period Jews were mostly engaged in craftsmanship and trading. Part of Mazyr's industry, the match factory and the wood sawing factory were owned by Jews.

There were eight active synagogues, a yeshiva, Jewish school and Talmud-Torah school in the wake of the 20th century. All of the facilities had been closed down by 1939.

Thousands of Jews were executed by the Nazis in the local ghetto during World War II. After the mass execution, almost no Jews remained in the city, whereas before the war 30% of the population within the city was Jewish. On August 31, 1941, hundreds of Jews gathered inside a house at Malo-Pushkin street. They poured kerosene on the building walls and set it alight, while the people huddled inside. The mass suicide was an attempt to escape execution by the Nazis. The incident is known as the "Belarusian Masada".

After the war some Jews returned to Mazyr. Although they refused to take back the partially-destroyed synagogue building, an official Jewish community was registered in 1946. A few years later, authorities denied the organization's right to exist. The community organization was re-established officially in 1989, when a revival began in the city. A synagogue and a Jewish culture club were opened.

Places of interest
• A monument for Jews at the place of a mass grave
• A monument composed of black polished granite, commemorating the aforementioned "Belarusian Masada"
• A monument placed at the point of mass executions
• The Mazyr Castle, dating back to 16th century
• The Pkhov river port, the biggest port of Belarus

Population

Transport
Mazyr has a tram service, which commenced operation on 1 August 1988. The line starts at the tram depot and terminates at the oil refinery, with four turning loops located along the route. It is designed to server Mazyr Oil Refinery (MNPZ) and is owned by the refinery. Services on the tram line are coordinated with shifts at the refinery; service throughout the day is every 25-95 minutes while during the peaks it is 3-12 minutes, though those services pass suburban stops without stopping. Most passengers are workers, though it also serves residents living near the line. The total length of the line is 20.3 km, with a full trip time of 40 minutes. The line has a high-speed layout, with radius of minimum 400 meters. There were plans for a second tram line, but this has not come to fruition. The rolling stock is mainly 71-605 and its derivative vehicles.

Educational Centers
I.P. Shamyakin State Pedagogical University
State Politehnikum (Technical College)
Medical College
Music College
Art School
State Lycee
Gomel State School of Olympic Reserve

Twin towns – sister cities

Mazyr is twinned with:
 Chojnice, Poland
 Severodvinsk, Russia

Notable residents
 Siarhiej Dubaviec (b. 1959) – Belarusian journalist and writer
 George de Mohrenschildt⁣ – geologist and friend of Lee Harvey Oswald
 Isaac Don Levine was born there
 Zbigniew Morsztyn⁣ – Polish nobleman of Leliwa coat of arms, poet of the Baroque era, soldier, member of the Polish Brethren, Miecznik of Mazyr. Cousin and co-worker of Jan Andrzej Morsztyn.
 Ksenia Sitnik⁣ – singer and winner of the Junior Eurovision Song Contest 2005
 Dzyanis Laptsew⁣ – footballer
 Hesya Helfman⁣ – member of Narodnaya Volya, who was implicated in the assassination of Tsar Alexander II

References

External links

Satellite photo of Mazyr (from Google Maps). Ravines can be seen very clearly.
Mazyr town at Radzima.org
FC Slavia-Mozyr Official Site - www.slaviya.info
FC Slavia - www.slavia-mozyr.com
Сайт горада Мазыр 
Cities of Belarus:Mozyr
International Festival 'Hey, Rocknem!'
 The murder of the Jews of Mazyr during World War II, at Yad Vashem website
 

 
Populated places in Gomel Region
Cities in Belarus
1155 establishments in Europe
Dregovichs
Kiev Voivodeship
Minsk Voivodeship
Mozyrsky Uyezd
Mazyr District